Prairie Township is an inactive township in Lincoln County, in the U.S. state of Missouri.

Prairie Township was established in 1848, and named for prairie land within its borders.

References

Townships in Missouri
Townships in Lincoln County, Missouri